Michael S. Leshing was an American citizen and the Superintendent of Twentieth Century Fox film laboratories in the 1940s.  He was awarded an Oscar in 1945 for Technical Achievement for his work in color film processing.

Leshing was also linked to a covert relationship with Soviet intelligence during World War II.  In 1943, a Venona project decryption reported that he provided the KGB's Technical Line intelligence documents and a formula for color motion pictures and other film-processing technology. 

Leshing is referenced in the following Venona project decryption:

512 KGB San Francisco to Moscow, 7 December 1943.

References

AMPAS - Index of Motion Picture Credits - Films
John Earl Haynes and Harvey Klehr, Venona: Decoding Soviet Espionage in America (New Haven: Yale University Press, 1999), pg. 292.

American spies for the Soviet Union
American people in the Venona papers
Espionage in the United States